Douglas Dean Smail (born 2 September 1957) is a Canadian former professional ice hockey left winger who played in the National Hockey League (NHL) for 13 seasons from 1980 through 1993.

Playing career
Smail starred at the University of North Dakota for three seasons from 1977 to 1980, scoring 87 points in 40 games in his final season in the WCHA. His performance was enough to warrant notice from the Winnipeg Jets, and the next season he was a full-time NHL player.

Smail played eleven seasons with Winnipeg, being a top two-way player for them, as he had twelve consecutive seasons in which he scored at least one shorthanded goal, with a total of 28 shorthanded goals in his career.

Perhaps Smail's greatest claim to fame was when he tied the NHL record for fastest goal after the opening faceoff by scoring a goal five seconds after the game started on 20 December 1981. Smail finished his career with the Minnesota North Stars, Quebec Nordiques and Ottawa Senators, but never achieved the success he had in Winnipeg.

After Smail's NHL career was over, he played three seasons in Britain for the Fife Flyers and Cardiff Devils before retiring. He was the first player ever to sign for a British team directly from an NHL team when he signed with Fife from the Senators.

He now resides in Colorado with his wife and three children. Smail was the assistant coach of the U-16 Team Rocky Mountain AAA Hockey program, where he coached alongside former NHL player Rick Berry, and is now the head coach of the Rocky Mountain Roughriders U-18 AAA squad.

Awards and honors

Named to the NCAA Championship Tournament MVP (1980)
Played in NHL All-Star Game (1990)
British Ice Hockey Writers Association Player of the Year (1994)

Records
Winnipeg Jets/Phoenix Coyotes franchise record for career shorthanded goals (25)
Fastest goal to start an NHL hockey game (5 seconds) - shared with Merlyn Phillips, Bryan Trottier and Alexander Mogilny

Career statistics

Regular season and playoffs

References

External links

1957 births
Living people
Canadian ice hockey left wingers
Cardiff Devils players
Fife Flyers players
Sportspeople from Moose Jaw
Minnesota North Stars players
National Hockey League All-Stars
Ottawa Senators players
Quebec Nordiques players
Undrafted National Hockey League players
University of North Dakota alumni
North Dakota Fighting Hawks men's ice hockey players
Winnipeg Jets (1979–1996) players
Ice hockey people from Saskatchewan
Canadian expatriate ice hockey players in the United States
Canadian expatriate ice hockey players in Scotland
Canadian expatriate ice hockey players in Wales
NCAA men's ice hockey national champions